J. Eliazer Stadion is an association football stadium in Groningen, Suriname. It is home to SVB Eerste Klasse clubs SV Boskamp and Real Saramacca. The stadium was built in 1949 and named after its founder Jacques Jean Eliazer. The stadium seats 1,000 people

Location
The J. Eliazer Stadium is located in Groningen, Saramacca District on the Pannekoekstraat.

References

Football venues in Suriname
Athletics (track and field) venues in Suriname
Multi-purpose stadiums in Suriname